The AC4 (Australian Cruiser Tank Mk. 4) was a cruiser tank designed in Australia in World War II as the intended successor to the AC3 Thunderbolt. Like its predecessors the AC4 was to have a one piece cast hull and turret. The AC4's most important characteristic would be the use of a 17 pounder tank gun.

History

Reservations about the utility of the 25 pounder in the AC3, and the 25 pounder's limited ability to pierce armour led to experimentation with a 17 pounder mounted on an Australian cruiser.

A turret was built and mounted on one of the earlier development vehicles to assess the vehicle's ability to mount the foremost Allied anti-tank gun of the day – the British 17 pounder (76 mm, 3 in). This was achieved by mounting two 25 pounder gun-howitzers which when fired together would significantly exceed the recoil of a 17 pounder. In this configuration the tank was tested on 2 November 1942. It fitted with a 17 pounder and after successful gunnery trials on 17 November 1942 the 17 pounder was selected for the AC4 design. For the AC4 the 17 pounder was to be mounted in a new and larger turret, attached by a 70-inch (1778 mm) diameter turret ring, the space for which was accommodated by changes to the upper hull permitted by the compact nature of the "Perrier-Cadillac".

A design for the tank had been established, however it was subject to a redesign to alter the internal stowage, and include new features not previously considered such as removal of the turret basket, addition of a gyro-stabiliser, and swapping a hydraulic traverse for the electrical system, and torsion bar suspension for the volute spring used up until that point.

The programme was authorised to build a total of 510 AC4 tanks. Of these 510 tanks, 110 were to be the "A" variant fitted with a 25 pounder tank gun instead of the 17 pounder. While the AC4 did not receive a formal name the Director of AFV Production, Alfred Code, had the name "Woomera" in mind for the tank. The design was not yet finalised when the programme was terminated in July 1943.

Variants
AC4A
one 25 pounder gun
one Vickers machine gun

See also

Tanks of comparable role, performance, and era

 Australia Thunderbolt
 British Cromwell
 Canadian Grizzly I
 German Panzer IV
 Hungarian Turán III
 Italian Carro Armato P 40
 Japanese Type 3 Chi-Nu
 Soviet T-34
 Swedish Stridsvagn m/42
 United States M4 Sherman

Notes
Footnotes

Citations

References

 

Cruiser tanks of Australia
World War II tanks of Australia
Military vehicles introduced from 1940 to 1944